José Luís Franca Abranches Pinto (born June 19, 1956 in Lisboa) is a retired male race walker from Portugal, who represented his native country at three consecutive Olympic Games, starting in 1984.

Achievements

References

1956 births
Living people
Portuguese male racewalkers
Athletes (track and field) at the 1984 Summer Olympics
Athletes (track and field) at the 1988 Summer Olympics
Athletes (track and field) at the 1992 Summer Olympics
Olympic athletes of Portugal
Athletes from Lisbon